El duende flamenco de Paco de Lucía (The Flamenco Soul of Paco de Lucía) is the eighth studio album by the Spanish composer and guitarist Paco de Lucía. All songs were written by Paco de Lucía.

Track listing
"Percusión Flamenca" – 3:41
"Barrio la Viña" – 3:25
"Doblan Campanas" – 5:44
"Farruca de Lucía" – 4:35
"Tientos del Mentidero" – 3:27
"Farolillo de Feria" – 4:05
"De Madrugada" – 3:10
"Cuando Canta el Gallo" – 3:48
"Punta del Faro" – 3:57
"Canastera" – 4:09

Personnel
 Paco de Lucía - Flamenco guitar

References
 Gamboa, Manuel José and Nuñez, Faustino. (2003). Paco de Lucía. Madrid:Universal Music Spain.

1972 albums
Paco de Lucía albums